Rani Rashmoni Green University is a public state university in Tarakeswar, Hooghly district, West Bengal. It was established in 2020 under the West Bengal Green University Act 2017. This university offers different courses in science and arts branch. This university also got the recognition from the University Grants Commission.

References

External links
 

Universities and colleges in Hooghly district
Universities and colleges in West Bengal
Educational institutions established in 2020
Hooghly district
2020 establishments in West Bengal